The New Zealand cricket team were scheduled to tour Bangladesh in August and September 2020 to play two Test matches. The Test series would have formed part of the inaugural 2019–2021 ICC World Test Championship. However, on 23 June 2020, the tour was postponed due to the COVID-19 pandemic. In July 2020, the International Cricket Council (ICC) confirmed it was their priority to reschedule the matches, along with the five other World Test Championship series that had been postponed due to the pandemic.

References

2020 in Bangladeshi cricket
2020 in New Zealand cricket
International cricket competitions in 2020
New Zealand cricket tours of Bangladesh
Cricket events postponed due to the COVID-19 pandemic